The 2022 North Carolina FC season will be the 16th season of the club's existence, and their second season in USL League One and the third division of the American soccer pyramid. North Carolina will be coached by John Bradford, his second season with the club, and play their home games at Sahlen's Stadium at WakeMed Soccer Park. The club finished at the bottom of the table in their first season in USL League One last season.

Club

Roster

Competitions

Exhibitions

USL League One

Standings

Match results

U.S. Open Cup

References

North Carolina FC seasons
North Carolina FC
North Carolina FC
North Carolina FC